Aspley may refer to the following places:

Australia 

 Aspley, Queensland, a suburb of Brisbane

 Electoral district of Aspley, an electorate in the Queensland Legislative Assembly

United Kingdom 
 Aspley, Nottingham, Nottinghamshire, England
 Aspley, Staffordshire, England, a location
 Aspley, West Yorkshire, England
 Aspley Guise and Aspley Heath, Bedfordshire, England